The Lordonbahn was a  long narrow-gauge railway network with a gauge of  from Weiler (Villé) to Chaume de Lusse in the Vosges in France.

History 
The light railway was built in early 1915 by German pioneers and Russian prisoners of war.

Name 
Locals called the light railway Tacot Allemand.

Route 

Behind the border a branch branched off to the west to Lubine. At Wegspinne (German for track spider) station, another branch line branched off to the east to Trois Maisons from the main line leading south to Lusshof station (Chaume de Lusse). The Lusshof was above today's Tunnel Maurice-Lemaire at a station of the Eberhardt aerial tramway to Klein Rumbach (Petit Rombach).

Operation 

On 31 December 1917 five military steam loco­motives, eight benzene locomotives and 97 wagons were in use on the Lordonbahn, which were operated and maintained by 193 men. 77 of them belonged to the 24th Bavarian Brigade and 87 were soldiers from other military units. They were supported by 19 civilians and 10 prisoners of war from Russia and Romania. Every day, an average of 160 tons of weapons, ammunition and supplies were transported on 6 round trips with 32 wagons, as well as wounded soldiers in the opposite direction. In addition, a brand-new Borsig steam locomotive with five coupled wheel sets drove on the route (Borsig, 0-10-0, N° 10235/1917).

References

External links 
 A reminder of the travels on railways that were built or operated by Kodeis B (commander of the railway troops) in the period from 28 May to 3 June 1918, Goswin von Haag, Captain & Commander of the Railway Troops

600 mm gauge railways in France
Railway lines opened in 1917
Railway lines closed in 1918
Railway lines in Grand Est